The 2015–16 Liga I (also known as Liga 1 Orange for sponsorship reasons) was the 98th season of the Liga I, the top professional league for Romanian association football clubs. The season began 10 July 2015 and ended on 29 May 2016, being the first to take place since the play-off/play-out format has been introduced.

FC Steaua București were the defending champions for a third consecutive time, but they did not retain the title. Astra Giurgiu became winners for the first time in their history.

Teams
The last six teams from the 2014–15 season were relegated to their respective 2015–16 Liga II division. Gaz Metan Mediaș, Brașov, Universitatea Cluj, Rapid București, Oțelul Galați and Ceahlăul Piatra Neamț.

The first team from each of the two divisions of 2014–15 Liga II advanced to Liga I. Voluntari promoted as the winners of Seria I.  It is their first season in Liga I. ACS Poli Timișoara promoted as the winners of Seria II.  It is their second season in Liga I.

Venues

Personnel and kits

Note: Flags indicate national team as has been defined under FIFA eligibility rules. Players and Managers may hold more than one non-FIFA nationality.

Managerial changes

Regular season
In the regular season the 14 teams will meet twice, a total of 26 matches per team, with the top 6 advancing to the Championship round and the bottom 8 qualifying for Relegation round.

Table

Results

Positions by round

Championship play-offs
The top six teams from Regular season met twice (10 matches per team) for places in 2016–17 UEFA Champions League and 2016–17 UEFA Europa League as well as deciding the league champion. Teams started the Championship round with their points from the Regular season halved, rounded upwards, and no other records carried over from the Regular season.

Table

Results

Positions by round

Relegation play-outs
The bottom eight teams from regular season will meet twice (14 matches per team) to contest against relegation. Teams start the Relegation round with their points from the Regular season halved, rounded upwards, and no other records carried over from the Regular season. The winner of the Relegation round finishes 7th in the overall season standings, the second placed team – 8th, and so on, with the last placed team in the Relegation round being 14th.

Table

Results

Positions by round

Promotion/relegation play-offs
The 12th-placed team of the Liga I faces the winner of the match between second place from Liga II, Seria I and second place from Seria II.

First round

Second round

Notes:
 Voluntari qualified for 2016–17 Liga I and UTA Arad qualified for 2016–17 Liga II.

Season statistics

Top scorers
Updated to matches played on 29 May 2016

Hat-tricks

Clean sheets
Updated to matches played on 29 May 2016

* Only goalkeepers who played all 90 minutes of a match are taken into consideration.

Discipline
As of 29 May 2016

Player
Most yellow cards: 13
 Adrian Ropotan (Pandurii Târgu Jiu)
 Gabriel Mureșan (Târgu Mureș)
Most red cards: 3
 Steliano Filip (Dinamo București)

Club
Most yellow cards: 119
Petrolul Ploiești
Most red cards: 14
Târgu Mureș

Champion squad

Monthly awards

Notes

References

External links
 Official website

2015-16
1
ro